Tin(II) bromide is a chemical compound of tin and bromine with a chemical formula of SnBr2. Tin is in the +2 oxidation state. The stability of tin compounds in this oxidation state is attributed to the inert pair effect.

Structure and bonding
In the gas phase SnBr2 is non-linear with a bent configuration similar to SnCl2 in the gas phase. The Br-Sn-Br angle is 95°  and the Sn-Br bond length is 255pm. There is evidence of dimerisation in the gaseous phase. The solid state structure is related to that of SnCl2 and PbCl2 and  the tin atoms have five near bromine atom neighbours in an approximately trigonal bipyramidal configuration. Two polymorphs exist: a room-temperature orthorhombic polymorph, and a high-temperature hexagonal polymorph. Both contain (SnBr2)∞ chains but the packing arrangement differs.

Preparation
Tin(II) bromide can be prepared by the reaction of metallic tin and HBr distilling off the H2O/HBr and cooling:
Sn + 2 HBr → SnBr2 + H2

However, the reaction will produce tin (IV) bromide in the presence of oxygen.

Reactions
SnBr2 is soluble in donor solvents such as acetone, pyridine and dimethylsulfoxide to give pyramidal adducts.
A number of hydrates are known, 2SnBr2·H2O, 3SnBr2·H2O & 6SnBr2·5H2O which in the solid phase have tin coordinated by a distorted trigonal prism of 6 bromine atoms with Br or H2O  capping 1 or 2 faces.
When dissolved in HBr the pyramidal SnBr3− ion is formed.
Like SnCl2 it is a reducing agent. With  a variety of alkyl bromides oxidative addition can occur to yield the alkyltin tribromide e.g.
SnBr2 + RBr → RSnBr3

Tin(II) bromide can act as a Lewis acid forming adducts with donor molecules e.g. trimethylamine where it forms NMe3·SnBr2 and 2NMe3·SnBr2

It can also act as both donor and acceptor in, for example, the complex F3B·SnBr2·NMe3 where it is a donor to boron trifluoride and an acceptor to trimethylamine.

References

Bromides
Metal halides
Tin(II) compounds
Reducing agents